Greek café culture in Australia is part of the shared history of Greece and Australia. For unskilled penniless Greek migrants, it was a pathway to success in which they created community hubs where Australians socialised. Greek cafés are also a singularly Australian phenomenon: the success of Arthur Comino’s fish shop in Sydney gave rise to a chain migration that saw hundreds of Greek migrants open oyster saloons across the country by 1900. Adapting to market changes and food trends, Greek proprietors went on to run fish shops, fruit shops, ice cream parlours, sundae shops, milk bars, snack bars, confectioneries, and cafés that dotted the Australian landscape for much of the twentieth century.

Almost every town in Queensland, New South Wales, and country Victoria had a Greek café, and as many as ten operated in larger towns like Ipswich and Toowoomba during the 1930s, 1940s and 1950s—the heyday of the Greek café. Cafés were routinely open from 7am to midnight seven days a week, meals were cheap, portions were generous, and the menu was mostly the same countrywide. They have been described as the McDonalds of their time.

The success of the Greek café is evident in the size of some establishments, the length of time some shops operated, the enterprise and resilience demonstrated by expansion and diversification, and the extent to which subsequent generations prospered in the adopted homeland of their parents and grandparents. This occurred despite the Anglophile Australia of the first half of the century. While names like the Paragon Café suggested proprietors’ origins, and names like Niagara Café exploited the popularity of American culture, others—the Regal Café, the Australia Café, etc.—were an attempt to align businesses with Australian sentiments. Greek food was not on the menu for the same reason.

Heritage listings 
A number of Greek cafes are heritage-listed:

 Roxy Theatre and Peters Greek Cafe Complex in Bingara, New South Wales
Paragon Cafe in Katoomba, New South Wales
Comino's Cafe in Redcliffe, Queensland

See also

 Greek cafes in Queensland
 Coffee in Greece

References

Attribution 

Coffeehouses and cafés in Australia
Greek-Australian culture
Coffee culture in Australia